Estrie Language School/ Estrie International Language School (l’École de langues de l’Estrie) was a language school based in Gatineau, Quebec, at 115 Champlain Road. It was situated near the Palais des congrès de Gatineau and the Place du Portage. It also had classrooms at 200 Elgin Street in Ottawa. The school offered language classes in English and in French. The school’s clients were international students who primarily came from South Korea, Japan, Colombia, and Saudi Arabia. The school also had contracts with the Government of Canada to teach English and French to Canadian government employees.
Estrie Language School was owned by Louise Charest who founded it in 1986. Louise Charest is the sister of former Quebec premier Jean Charest.
It closed on January 23, 2014 due to bankruptcy.

References

Language schools in Canada
Defunct schools in Canada